Deutsche Biographie is a German-language online biographical dictionary. It published thus far information about more than 730,000 individuals and families (2016). All entries are linked to the Integrated Authority File (GND).

The German Biography also contains the articles from

 Allgemeine Deutsche Biographie (ADB: 1875–1912)
 Neue Deutsche Biographie (NDB: 1953–2023)
 NDB-online (2020– )

References

External links
 Deutsche Biographie
 Deutsche Biographie – About

German biographical dictionaries
German-language websites
2001 establishments in Germany
Internet properties established in 2001